Barnett Hugh Jenkins (7 March 1884 – 14 June 1948) was an Australian rules footballer who played for the Essendon Football Club in the Victorian Football League (VFL).

Death
He died (suddenly) on 14 June 1948.

Notes

References
 
 Maplestone, M., Flying Higher: History of the Essendon Football Club 1872–1996, Essendon Football Club, (Melbourne), 1996.

External links 
 		
 

1884 births
1948 deaths
Australian rules footballers from Victoria (Australia)
Essendon Football Club players